Mario Trejo (13 January 1926 – 14 May 2012) was an Argentine poet, playwright, screenwriter, and journalist.

Biography
Mario César Trejo was born on January 13, 1926, though there is disagreement on his birth city; some sources indicate the city of Buenos Aires, while others La Plata; yet, Jorge Ariel Madrazo states in his prologue written for Trejo's poem entitled Orgasm (Orgasmo) that "Mario Trejo declares, otherwise, being born in Tierra del Fuego, in Comodoro Rivadavia, or in many other locations: everything indicates that this happened in the southern part of the country, but he does not specify in which year (Trejo agrees with Marcel Duchamp in that such precisions "only serve the fools and Spanish literature professors." He collaborated with several Argentine literary journals such as Contemporánea (1949), Luz y sombra (1948), Cinedrama, revista de cine y teatro contemporáneos (1953), Ciclo y Conjugación de Buenos Aires, as well as others European publications such as L'Expresso of Rome.

Career
Trejo was part of the very important "Poetry Buenos Aires Movement", formed in the 50s around the "Poetry Buenos Aires" magazine directed by Raúl Gustavo Aguirre, of which 30 editions were published during a decade, starting on the spring of 1950. Other important poets of those years collaborated, like Alberto Vanasco, Edgar Bailey, Rodolfo Alonso, Ramiro de Casasbellas, Paco Urondo, Alejandra Pizarnik, Daniel Giribaldi, Miguel Brascó, Elizabeth Azcona Cronwell, Natalio Hocsman and Jorge Carrol.

He also worked in cinema and two films must be mentioned: in The Oil Route (Italy, 1966) Trejo interpreted himself, directed by Bernardo Bertolucci, whereas Desarraigo (Uprooted, Cuba 1965), directed by Fausto Canel, obtained an honorable mention at the 1966 San Sebastián International Film Festival.

His long relationship with music, his years of friendship with many musicians, derived in some very important collaborations like the songs The Lost Birds and Private Scandals with Ástor Piazzolla, or Enrico Rava's excellent album Quotation Marks (Japo Records, 1976), in which played, among others, John Abercrombie, Jack DeJohnette and the Argentinian musicians Néstor Astarita and Ricardo Lew, and in which the singer Jeanne Lee sings  Trejo's poems written in English.

Award
In 1964, Trejo unanimously won the Casa de las Américas literary award for his book The use of the word.

Death
He died on 14 May 2012 at the age of 86 years.

Works
Poetry
Celdas de la sangre (1946)
El uso de la palabra (1964)
La pena capital (1980)
Orgasmo y otros poemas (1989)
Playwright
No hay piedad para Hamlet (No Mercy for Hamlet, 1954), in collaboration with Alberto Vanasco, Buenos Aires Municipal Award, 1957, and Florencio Sánchez National Award, 1960.
Libertad y otras intoxicaciones (1968)
Libertad, Libertad, Libertad (1968)
La reconstrucción de la Ópera de Viena (1968)
La guerra civil (1973)
Screenplays
El final (1964)
Desarraigo (1965)
Infinito futuro/Kill me future (1965), in collaboration with Bernardo Bertolucci; however, the screenplay that was never shot.
Song lyrics
Los pájaros perdidos (1973), music by Ástor Piazzolla.
La tristeza y el mar, music by Waldo de los Ríos.

References

Argentine male poets
Argentine dramatists and playwrights
Argentine screenwriters
Male screenwriters
1926 births
2012 deaths
Burials at La Chacarita Cemetery
Male dramatists and playwrights
20th-century Argentine poets
20th-century Argentine male writers
20th-century dramatists and playwrights